The Thor-Delta, also known as Delta DM-19 or just Delta was an early American expendable launch system used for 12 orbital launches in the early 1960s. A derivative of the Thor-Able, it was a member of the Thor family of rockets, and the first member of the Delta family.

The first stage was a Thor missile in the DM-19 configuration. The second stage was the Delta, which had been derived from the earlier Able stage. An Altair solid rocket motor was used as a third stage.

The basic design of the original Vanguard upper stages, featuring a pressure-fed nitric acid/UDMH, regeneratively cooled engine, was kept in place, but with an improved AJ10-118 engine. More significantly, the Delta stage featured cold gas attitude control jets allowing it to be stabilized in orbit for restart and more precise burns.

The Thor-Delta was the first rocket to use the combination of a Thor missile and a Delta upper stage. This configuration was reused for many later rockets, and a derivative, the Delta II, remained in service until 2018.

The Thor-Delta launched a number of significant payloads, including the first communications satellite, Echo 1A; the first British satellite, Ariel 1; and the first active direct-relay communications satellite, Telstar 1. All 12 launches occurred from Cape Canaveral Air Force Station Launch Complex 17. The launch of Telstar 1 used pad B, while all other launches were from pad A. All launches were successful except the maiden flight, which failed to place Echo 1 into orbit due to a problem with the second stage.

Thor-Delta launches

1963 mystery cloud
On 28 February 1963, a Thor launch vehicle carrying a spy satellite into orbit was launched from Vandenberg Air Force Base. The rocket went off course and mission control detonated the rocket at an altitude of  before it could reach orbit. The rocket detonation produced a large circular cloud that appeared over the southwestern United States. Due to its mysterious nature, appearing at a very high altitude and being visible for hundreds of miles, the cloud attracted widespread attention and was published by the news media. The cloud was featured on the cover of Science Magazine in April 1963, Weatherwise Magazine in May 1963, and had a full page image published in the May issue of Life Magazine. Prof. James MacDonald at the University of Arizona Institute for Atmospheric Physics investigated the phenomena and linked it to the Thor rocket launch after contacting military personnel at Vandenberg Air Force Base. When the launch records were later declassified, the United States Air Force released a memo explaining that the cloud was the result of a military operation.

See also 

Delta (rocket family)

References 

Thor (rocket family)